ZC4H2 (Zinc finger Cys4His2-type) is a protein-coding gene located on the X-chromosome. This gene encodes a protein which is a member of the so-called zinc finger domain-containing protein family. There is currently very limited understanding about the ZC4H2 gene and its protein function.

Pathogenic variants of ZC4H2 which are associated with a clinical phenotype are referred to as "ZC4H2-Associated Rare Disorders".

The limited research published to date indicates that ZC4H2 is expressed at various developmental stages and is subject to X-inactivation in females. There are a few families and singletons (males and females) with pathogenic variants of ZC4H2 described in the medical literature. In the families the variants can be transmitted as an X-linked recessive trait, which means that the disorder is fully expressed predominantly in males, while their carrier female siblings are unaffected or much less severely affected. In contrast to these females, heterozygous de novo variants in ZC4H2 in singleton females can result in a specific phenotype.

The pathogenic variants of ZC4H2 may result in impairment of the central and peripheral nervous system through the impairment of neurologic development or synaptic plasticity. Studies in zebrafish showed that the homologue of human ZC4H2 is associated with the generation of a specific subset of central nervous system interneurons.

Besides the cases described in the current literature, an additional 46 diagnosed cases of males and females with ZC4H2 deficiency are known worldwide, constituting this an ultra-rare orphan disorder.

Phenotypes
There is no clear prediction of the phenotypic expression but it is known that the disorder can be fully expressed in males, while the clinical presentation in singleton females who have a de novo variant can be very variable.

Patients with this condition can have several disabilities and health concerns, including a large array of neuromuscular and neurological manifestations. These can include:

 Arthrogryposis multiplex congenita (AMC)
 Muscular atrophy of pelvis and lower extremities 
 Trunk hypotonia and decreased trunk stability
 Dysphagia 
 Respiratory distress
 Joint dislocations of mainly hips
 Elevated muscular tone in lower extremities
 Spasticity
 Dystonia
 Autonomic storms
 Camptodactyly 
 Apraxia of speech
 Oculomotor apraxia 
 Cortical visual impairment
 Epilepsy
 Global developmental delay

To date, there is no cure or effective treatment for this condition, but a correlation has been observed between early therapeutic interventions and more favorable outcomes. The current approach consists of supportive therapies and medical interventions, including surgery to alleviate specific malformations.

Notes

References

Genetic diseases and disorders